Gerd Morad Beg (also Romanized as Gerd Morād Beg; also known as Gerd Morad Beyg) is a village in Lahijan-e Sharqi Rural District, Lajan District, Piranshahr County, West Azerbaijan Province, Iran. At the 2006 census, its population was 70, in 10 families.

References 

Populated places in Piranshahr County